Dakshin Khayer Bari is a village in Barogharia Gram Panchayet of Dhupguri, Jalpaiguri district, West Bengal, India.

According to census 2011 information the location code or village code of Dakshin Khairbari village is 307482. As per 2009 statistics, Barogharia is the gram panchayat of Dakshin Khairbari village.

The total geographical area of village is 713.06 hectares. Dakshin Khairbari has a total population of 5,531 people. There are about 1,223 houses in Dakshin Khairbari village.

Education
Schools include:
 Dakshin Khayer Addition Primary School
 Dakshin Khayer Bari High School (X)
 Sonardanga Primary School
 Netaji Club & Pathagar
 Begunbari Sarada Shishu Mandir

Service
 A Sub-Road between Dakshin Khairbari and Dhupguri.

References

External links
Dhupguri municipal website

Villages in Jalpaiguri district